The Astronomische Gesellschaft Katalog (AGK) is an astrometric star catalogue.  Compilation for the first version, AGK1, was started in 1861 by Friedrich Argelander and published between 1890 and 1954, listing 200 000 stars down to ninth magnitude.

The second version, AGK2, was started in the 1920s, and published between 1951 and 1958 using photographic data obtained from the Bonn and Hamburg Observatories.

The third version, AGK3, was started in 1956 and published in 1975.  It contains 183,145 stars north of declination –2° with mean positional errors of ±0.13" and mean proper motion errors of ±0.009"/year.

See also
 Hoher List Observatory

References
 DavidDarling.info
 Astro.it

External links
 AGK3 query form from VizieR

Astronomical catalogues of stars